Mohamed Ahmed Aly (1920 – 29 January 2003) was an Egyptian sports shooter. He competed in the 50 m pistol event at the 1952 Summer Olympics.

References

1920 births
2003 deaths
Egyptian male sport shooters
Olympic shooters of Egypt
Shooters at the 1952 Summer Olympics
Place of birth missing